, better known by his stage name , is a Japanese violinist, conductor, composer and music arranger. Saito is the leader of the Saito Neko Quartet, and is known for his many collaborations with musician Ringo Sheena.

Biography 

Saito began playing the violin at the age of three, and in 1966 made his first appearance on the NHK television show Violin no Okeiko at the age of seven. In 1975, he began attending the Tokyo University of the Arts associated music high school, and in 1978 entered the university itself, majoring in composition. He joined the string ensemble Pivot while at university, and began working as the assistant of Hideo Ichikawa in 1979.

From 1984, Saito worked as a violinist for the tours of musicians Akiko Kobayashi and Kosetsu Minami, and in 1987 began work as a commercial jingle producer. In 1988, Saito formed the Saito Neko Quartet. They released the album Friendly Games in 1990. In 1992, Saito released an album of classical music, Hajimete no Classic Series 17: Heishi no Monogatari.

From 1990, Saito began collaborating with Hiroko Taniyama, arranging three songs on her album Tsumetai Mizu no Naka o Kimi to Aruiteiku. He continued to work on arranging songs from her original albums throughout the 1990s.

In 1999, Saito began collaborating with singer Ringo Sheena, performing violins on her debut album Muzai Moratorium. In 2003, Saito arranged Sheena's song "La salle de bain", and in 2007 the pair worked together to create Heisei Fūzoku, a soundtrack album for the film Sakuran. The soundtrack was commercially successful, reaching number one in Japan and becoming certified gold by the RIAJ.

Other than Taniyama and Sheena, Saito has collaborated with musicians Sayuri Ishikawa, Hikaru Utada, X Japan, Maaya Sakamoto, Seikima-II, Tamurapan, Radwimps and Yuki.

Television programs 

Saito arranged the soundtrack for the anime Mizuiro Jidai (1996–1997), alongside Harukichi Yamamoto. He arranged the soundtrack for the Kyoko Fukada-starring drama Imagine in 2001, and in 2009 started producing the music for the children's music program Okaasan to Issho for the Monoran Monoran and Poco Potteito segments.

Discography 
Friendly Games (1990) (with Saito Neko Quartet)
 (1992)
 (2000) (with Saito Neko Quartet)
 (2000) (with Saito Neko Quartet)
Palette (2000) (with Kōko Komine)
 (2003)
 (2007) (with Ringo Sheena)

References

External links 

Official website

1959 births
20th-century classical composers
20th-century classical violinists
20th-century conductors (music)
20th-century Japanese male musicians
21st-century classical composers
21st-century classical violinists
21st-century conductors (music)
21st-century Japanese male musicians
Japanese classical composers
Japanese classical violinists
Japanese conductors (music)
Japanese male classical composers
Japanese male conductors (music)
Japanese music arrangers
Living people
Musicians from Tokyo